Murray Wright is a New Zealand rugby league player who represented New Zealand in the 1975 World Cup.

Playing career
Wright played for Otahuhu and played for Auckland. He was selected for the New Zealand national rugby league team squad for the 1975 World Cup, but did not play a match at the tournament.

In 1976 Wright moved to Christchurch, joining the Hornby club and representing Canterbury. The New Zealand Rugby League imposed a $1000 transfer fee.

References

Living people
New Zealand rugby league players
New Zealand national rugby league team players
Auckland rugby league team players
Otahuhu Leopards players
Hornby Panthers players
Canterbury rugby league team players
Rugby league hookers
Year of birth missing (living people)